The Burman: His Life and Notions (1882) is a book about the peoples and customs of Burma (now Myanmar). First published under the pseudonym Shway Yoe, the book was written by the Scottish journalist and British colonial administrator James George Scott. The book caused a sensation when it was first published because it was considered impossible that a Burman could write so well in English - Shway Yoe's unbiased tone and positive curiosity is also one reason that the author was presumed Burmese by the British.

The author made an extremely detailed description of the Burmese people and their culture, from their pagoda festivals to their lacquer, traditions, religion, dressing, food, and many other categories.

References

See also
Bamar
Culture of Myanmar

1882 non-fiction books
Burmese culture
Books about Myanmar
Works published under a pseudonym